Pochas are a type of Spanish string bean, which originated in the regions of La Rioja and Navarre. The beans are served ripe, rather than dried and re-hydrated.

References

Spanish cuisine
Edible legumes